Honor Bound is a 1928 American drama film directed by Alfred E. Green and starring George O'Brien, Estelle Taylor and Leila Hyams.

Cast
 George O'Brien as John Oglegree  
 Estelle Taylor as Evelyn Mortimer 
 Leila Hyams as Selma Ritchie  
 Tom Santschi as Mr. Mortimer  
 Frank Cooley  as Dr. Ritchie  
 Sam De Grasse as Blood Keller  
 Al Hart as Cid Ames  
 Harry Gripp  as Skip Collier  
 George Irving as State Governor

References

Bibliography
 Solomon, Aubrey. The Fox Film Corporation, 1915-1935: A History and Filmography. McFarland, 2011.

External links

1928 films
1928 drama films
Silent American drama films
Films directed by Alfred E. Green
American silent feature films
1920s English-language films
Fox Film films
American black-and-white films
1920s American films